Caroline Eugenie Lagerfelt (born September 23, 1947) is a Paris-born American actress, long based in the United States, recognized for her roles on Sweet Magnolias, Gossip Girl, Six Degrees, Dirty Sexy Money, Nash Bridges and Beverly Hills, 90210.

Lagerfelt was born to Swedish diplomat and ambassador Baron I. Karl-Gustav Lagerfelt and Sara Champion de Crespigny, the daughter of the British major Vierville Champion de Crespigny and Nora (née McSloy). She grew up in Japan, Vienna, Switzerland, Luxembourg, Brussels, and Sweden, and attended boarding school in England. She emigrated to the United States and attended the American Academy of Dramatic Arts.

She has appeared on Broadway in Betrayal directed by Sir Peter Hall, Lend Me a Tenor directed by Jerry Zaks (Outer Critics Circle Award), A Small Family Business directed by Lynne Meadow, The Real Thing directed by Mike Nichols, Otherwise Engaged directed by Harold Pinter, The Constant Wife with Ingrid Bergman directed by John Gielgud (Drama Desk nomination), The Philanthropist, The Jockey Club Stakes directed by Cyril Ritchard, and Four on a Garden directed by Abe Burrows.

She has appeared extensively Off-Broadway in Notes on My Mother's Decline, Nathan the Wise, King Liz, Indian Ink, The Prime of Miss Jean Brodie, Guantanamo: Honor Bound to Defend Freedom, Moonlight, Hamlet, Phaedra Brittanica, The Creditors, Close of Play, Other Places, Cloud Nine, Quartermaine's Terms directed by Harold Pinter, receiving an Obie Award for her work.

Regional and international credits include Marina Abramovic: An Artist's Life Manifesto, Elektra, Greta Garbo Came to Donegal, The Injured Party, Mary Stuart, The Misanthrope, The Physicists, The Resistible Rise of Arturo Ui, Les Liaisons Dangereuses, A Midsummer Night's Dream and To Grandmother's House We Go with Eva Le Galliene.

She has two sons and resides in Santa Monica and New York.

Filmography

References

General sources
 
 Caroline Lagerfelt biography at Film Reference
  at the Oakland East Bay Symphony

External links
 

1947 births
20th-century American actresses
21st-century American actresses
Actresses from Paris
American Academy of Dramatic Arts alumni
American film actresses
American people of Swedish descent
American stage actresses
American television actresses
Daughters of barons
Swedish nobility
French emigrants to the United States
French people of Swedish descent
Living people
People with acquired American citizenship
20th-century French women